Larkana Junction railway station is located in middle of the Larkana, Sindh, Pakistan. The station is staffed and has a booking office.

Routes
The routes are Larkana from linked to Karachi,  Lahore, Quetta,  Peshawar, Rawalpindi, Nowshera, Hyderabad, Sibi, Sukkur,  Attock, Mianwali, Dadu,  Rahim Yar Khan,  Shikarpur, Kotri, Rohri, Nawabshah and Jacobabad .

Services

See also 
 Pakistan Railways
 List of railway stations in Pakistan

References

Railway stations in Larkana District
Railway stations on Larkana–Jacobabad line
Railway stations on Kotri–Attock Railway Line (ML 2)